Parliamentary elections were held in Hungary between 9 and 13 March 1869. The main issues were the legitimisation of the Austro-Hungarian Compromise of 1867 and the birth of Austria-Hungary. The compromise was created by the governing party. Hungary got more freedom and autonomy from Austria, but still in a mutual state with Austria and Franz Joseph I of Austria was crowned as the King of Hungary.

At the elections three parties ran for the seats; Deák Party, the supporter of the compromise, the Left Centre, partially opponents of it and the Far-Left opposing the treaty entirely. Finally the Deák Party won the 55.95% of the seats.

Results

Hungary
Election
Elections in Hungary
Elections in Austria-Hungary

hu:Magyarországi országgyűlési választások a dualizmus korában#1869